SFSR may refer to: 

 A Soviet Federative Socialist Republic or Socialist Federative Soviet Republic, any of several Republics of the Soviet Union: 
 Russian Soviet Federative Socialist Republic (Russian SFSR) (1917-1991) 
 Transcaucasian Socialist Federative Soviet Republic (Transcaucasian SFSR) (1922-1936) 
 Santa Fe Southern Railway, a short line railroad in New Mexico, United States 
 San Francisco Syncope Rule, a clinical prediction rule for syncopal episodes